Kha-Manipur College, established in 1966, is a general degree college in Kakching, Manipur. It offers undergraduate courses in science, arts and commerce. It is affiliated to  Manipur University.

Departments

Science
Physics
Chemistry
Mathematics
Anthropology
Botany
Zoology

Arts and Commerce 
Manipuri
English
History
Geography
Political Science
Philosophy
Economics
Education
Commercial

Accreditation
The college is recognized by the University Grants Commission (UGC).

See also
Education in India
Manipur University
Literacy in India
List of institutions of higher education in Manipur

References

External links
http://www.khamanipurcollege.edu.in/

Colleges affiliated to Manipur University
Educational institutions established in 1966
Universities and colleges in Manipur
1966 establishments in Manipur